Gustavo Duarte (São Paulo, May 19, 1977) is a Brazilian cartoonist and comics artist. His work is known for his usually silent comics, which rely on the characters' body language.

Early life and education 
In 1999, Duarte graduated with a degree in Graphic Design from Unesp in Bauru.

Career 
During his studies, Duarte began working as an illustrator for the newspaper Diário de Bauru from 1997 to 1999. When he moved back to São Paulo in 2000, he worked as designer and illustrator for Editora Abril, while some of his work was also featured at Folha de S.Paulo and Lance! newspapers.

His first comic book, Có!, an independent publication, was awarded the Troféu HQ Mix of Best Independent Comic (Special Edition) in 2010. Duarte also received a prize for Best Artist-New Talent. Since Có, Duarte has published other comics, like Taxi, Birds, (both independent) and Monstros, his first work for a publishing house, Quadrinhos na Cia.

In 2014, Duarte's work debuted in the United States: Monstros, Có, and Birds were published by Dark Horse Comics as the single-volume Monsters and Other Stories. In the same year, Duarte drew Marvel 100th Anniversary: Guardians of the Galaxy #1,. For DC Comics  he worked on a Bizarro  miniseries in 2015, written by Heath Corson and Dear Justice League (2019) (written by Michael Northrop) .

Works 
Có!
Taxi
Monstros!
Birds
Chico Bento - Pavor Espaciar (Graphic MSP series)
13 (artbook)
Monsters and Other Stories (anthology)

References

External links 
 Official blog

Brazilian cartoonists
Brazilian comics artists
1977 births
Living people
People from São Paulo
São Paulo State University alumni
Prêmio Angelo Agostini winners